Nileas is a former municipality in Euboea, Greece. Since the 2011 local government reform it is part of the municipality Mantoudi-Limni-Agia Anna, of which it is a municipal unit. The municipal unit has an area of 129.017 km2. Population 2,144 (2011). The seat of the municipality was in Agia Anna.

References

Populated places in Euboea